Morning Mist is an album by jazz guitarist Chuck Wayne which was released on the Prestige label in 1965.

Reception

Allmusic reviewer Ronnie D. Lankford, Jr. stated: "Morning Mist was one of the small number of albums Wayne recorded as a leader ... Wayne's gentle touch runs toward the cool side of bop, though he's certainly capable of passionate work ... The guitarist renders himself most distinct, surprisingly, when he sets the guitar aside for the banjo ... Perhaps someone on Prestige's folk roster left the banjo behind in the studio, but whatever the reason for the choice, it was an inspired one. Morning Mist is a likable album and guitar lovers unfamiliar with Wayne's gifts will be glad".

Track listing
All compositions by Chuck Wayne except where noted
 "Goodbye" (Gordon Jenkins) – 2:30
 "See Saw" – 3:09
 "Li'l Darlin'" (Neal Hefti) – 4:07
 "I'll Get Along" – 2:30
 "Things Ain't What They Used to Be" (Mercer Ellington, Ted Persons) – 3:15
 "Shalimar" – 3:31
 "Someone to Watch Over Me" (George Gershwin, Ira Gershwin) – 2:46
 "The Song Is You" (Jerome Kern, Oscar Hammerstein II) – 2:57
 "Alone at Last" (Victor Young, Bob Hilliard) – 2:09
 "Lovely" (Stephen Sondheim) – 2:50

Personnel 
Chuck Wayne – guitar, banjo
Joe Williams – bass
Ronnie Bedford – drums

References 

1965 albums
Prestige Records albums
Chuck Wayne albums
Albums recorded at Van Gelder Studio
Albums produced by Cal Lampley